This table displays the top-rated primetime television series of the 1984–85 season as measured by Nielsen Media Research.

See also 
Year-end ratings for TV shows (newspapers.com: lists top 75 shows for the year)

References

1984 in American television
1985 in American television
1984-related lists
1985-related lists
Lists of American television series